Coponius was the 1st Roman governor (Prefect) of Judaea province (6 to 9).

Biography
He was, like the prefects who succeeded him, of knightly rank, and "had the power of life and death". During his administration the revolt of Judas the Galilean occurred, the cause of which was not so much the personality of Coponius as the introduction of Roman soldiers. Owing to the reconstruction of the province of Judea then in progress, the census was being taken by Quirinius, Roman legate of Syria, which was a further cause of offence. 

In 9, Coponius was recalled to Rome, and replaced by Marcus Ambivulus. Probably, it is on account of this occurrence that one door of the Temple bore the name of "door of Coponius". Regarding the personal attitude of Coponius toward the Jews, nothing definite is known.

See also
 Roman Procurator coinage

Notes

References
 Schürer, Gesch. 3d ed., i. 487;
 Schlatter, Zur Topogr. und Gesch. Palästinas, p. 206;
 Krauss, Lehnwörter, ii. 537.

Roman governors of Judaea
1st-century Romans
1st-century Roman governors of Judaea
Census of Quirinius